The III International Chopin Piano Competition was held from 21 February to 13 March 1937 in Warsaw. It was the last competition before the outbreak of World War II, and the competition would not be held again until 1949.

80 pianists from 22 countries took part in the competition, including two participants from faraway Japan. Contestants could choose between pianos manufactured by Bechstein, Bösendorfer, Pleyel and Steinway. Soviet pianist Yakov Zak was awarded the first prize.

Awards 

Out of 80 pianists in the elimination stage, 21 were admitted to the final, where they performed two consecutive movements of one of Chopin's two piano concertos with the Warsaw Philharmonic.

The two female Japanese pianists  and  received great acclaim among critics and the public. When news broke that Hara, who reached the final, was not among the prize-winners and was merely awarded an honorable mention, a commotion broke out. Fearing that the frenzied crowd would cause damage to the Philharmonic, industrialist Stanisław Meyer sponsored a special award for Hara.

The following prizes were awarded:

Two special prizes were awarded:

Jury 
The jury consisted of:
  Guido Agosti
  Wilhelm Backhaus (vice-chairman)
  
  Zofia Buckiewiczowa
  Marian Dąbrowski
  Zbigniew Drzewiecki
  Emil Frey
  Alfred Hoehn
  
  Lazare Lévy
  
  
  Heinrich Neuhaus
  Marie Panthès
  Isidor Philipp (vice-chairman)
  
  Lucyna Robowska
  Richard Rössler
  Emil von Sauer (vice-chairman)
  
  
  
  
  
  Magda Tagliaferro
  Józef Turczyński
   (chairman)
  Bolesław Woytowicz (secretary)
  Jerzy Żurawlew

References

Further reading

External links 
 
 

 

International Chopin Piano Competition
1937 in music
1937 in Poland
1930s in Warsaw